"Most High" is a song by English rock duo Jimmy Page and Robert Plant from their only studio album, Walking into Clarksdale (1998). The song features a keyboard overdub by Tim Whelan of Transglobal Underground, played in a quarter-tone to mimic Moroccan trance.

Release and reception 
Issued as a single in the United Kingdom and the United States on 30 March 1998, "Most High" reached  1 on the US Billboard Mainstream Rock chart, No. 26 on the UK Singles Chart, and No. 88 on the Australian Singles Chart. In 1999, the song won Page and Plant the Grammy Award for Best Hard Rock Performance.

B-side "The Window" was one of two known original songs from the sessions to not make the album, the other being "Whiskey from the Glass", included as a bonus on some editions of the album.

Music video 
The music video for "Most High" was directed by Italian-Canadian photographer and director Floria Sigismondi. It was included as a bonus feature on the DVD release of No Quarter: Jimmy Page and Robert Plant Unledded. The video, featuring visual references to the religious themes of the song's lyrics, depicts Jimmy Page and Robert Plant as prisoners in a numbered cell block, with other cells holding a series of mutated creatures practicing dark magic.

Track listings

Credits and personnel 
Credits are adapted from the Walking into Clarksdale album booklet.

Studio
 Recorded, mixed, and mastered at Abbey Road Studios (London, England)

Personnel

 Jimmy Page – writing, guitar, production
 Robert Plant – writing, vocals, production
 Charlie Jones – writing, bass
 Michael Lee – writing, drums
 Ed Shearmur – string pad, programming
 Tim Whelan – Oriental keyboard
 Steve Albini – recording, mixing
 Paul Hicks – studio assistant

Charts

Release history

References 

1998 singles
1998 songs
Atlantic Records singles
Grammy Award for Best Hard Rock Performance
Jimmy Page songs
Mercury Records singles
Robert Plant songs
Song recordings produced by Jimmy Page
Songs written by Jimmy Page
Songs written by Robert Plant